After the Bath is a painting from 1910 by the French painter Pierre-Auguste Renoir. The painting is now in the Barnes Foundation in Philadelphia.

Provenance
The painting was purchased from the artist in Paris, by Paul Durand-Ruel in October 1910. On December 18, 1915, Albert C. Barnes (the founder of the institution) purchased it from the latter.

References

Notes

Sources
 André, Albert. Renoir. Paris, G. Crès & Cie, 1923, plate 42.
 Barnes, Albert C. and Violette de Mazia. The Art of Henri-Matisse. New York: C. Scribner's Sons, 1933, 189, cat. data no. 433.
 The Art of Renoir. Merion, Pa.: The Barnes Foundation Press, 1935, 123 n, 124 n, 125 n, 126, 168 n, 195 n, 198 n, 328 ill., cat. data no. 247.
 De Mazia, Violette. "Creative Distortion: The Case of the Levitated Pear." The Barnes Foundation Journal of the Art Department 4, no. 1 (Spring 1973): 9, pl. 30.
 "The Barnes Foundation: The Display of Its Art Collection." Vistas 2, no. 2 (1981–1983): 112, pl. 125 (installation).
 "Form and Matter." Vistas 5, no. 2 (1991): 24–5, pl. 54.
 Basler, A. and Charles Kunstler. La Peinture Indépendante en France: De Monet à Bonnard. Paris: G. Crès et cie, 1929, plate 27 ill.
 Besson, G. Auguste Renoir. Paris: G. Crès et cie, 1932, pl. 22 ill.
 Fezzi, E. Tout l'oeuvre peint de Renoir: période impressioniste, 1869–1883. Paris: Flammarion, 1985, no. 706 ill.
 French Period Furniture & Decoration. Auction cat. Sotheby Parke Bernet. New York, June 15, 1950, no. 117. [on related sketch]
 Lucy, Martha and John House. Renoir in the Barnes Foundation. New Haven: Yale University Press, 2012: 18, 161, 177, 180 ill., 181, 185, 203, 306-7 cat. 51.
 Meier-Graefe, Julius. Renoir, 1929, p. 336, no. 354. Renoir, peintre du nu, préface d'Henri de Régnier. Paris, Les éditions Bernheim-Jeune, 1923, ill, n. p.
 Wattenmaker, Richard J. and Anne Distel. Great French Paintings from The Barnes Foundation: Impressionist, Post-Impressionist, and Early Modern. New York: Alfred A. Knopf in association with Lincoln University Press, 1993, 86, 87 ill.

1910 paintings
Paintings by Pierre-Auguste Renoir
Nude art
Collection of the Barnes Foundation